Şükrü Sanus (born 26 December 1966) is a Turkish sailor. He competed in the men's 470 event at the 1996 Summer Olympics.

References

External links
 

1966 births
Living people
Turkish male sailors (sport)
Olympic sailors of Turkey
Sailors at the 1996 Summer Olympics – 470
Place of birth missing (living people)